This is a list of automobile engines developed and sold by the Suzuki Motor Corporation. Suzuki is unusual in never having made a pushrod automobile engine, and in having depended on two-strokes for longer than most. Their first four-stroke engine was the SOHC F8A, which appeared in 1977. Suzuki continued to offer a two-stroke engine in an automotive application for a considerably longer time than any other Japanese manufacturer.

Straight twins

Suzulight SF Series 
 air-cooled 2-stroke,  bore × stroke (downsleeved copy of Lloyd LP400 engine)
 1955–1959 Suzulight SF
 1959–1963 Suzulight 360TL / Van 360 (TL)
 1962–1963 Suzulight Fronte TLA

FB Series 

	
 1961–1972 – Suzuki FB engine – air-cooled 359 cc
 1963–1969 – Suzuki FE/FE2 engine – air-cooled 359 cc, FF applications
 1972–1976 – Suzuki L50 engine – water-cooled 359 cc
 1974–1976 – Suzuki L60 engine – water-cooled 446 cc (export only)

FA/FC (prototype) 
 2-stroke,  bore/stroke. This prototype produced  at 6000 rpm. It was fitted to a rear-engined prototype (also named FC) in 1961, as part of the development work for the LC10 Fronte.

Daihatsu's AB10 

 1977.6–1978 – Daihatsu AB10 engine – 0.55 L

E08A engine  
 2015–2020 – see Diesel engines section – 0.8 L

Three cylinders

C engine — 2-stroke 
 C10 —  
 1965.12–1969.10 Suzuki Fronte 800
 C20 —  –  prototype engine for intended Suzuki Fronte 1100

LC engine 

1967–1977 – Suzuki LC engine – 0.36–0.48 L

FB engine 

1975–1987 – FB Series – 0.54 L
Rather than being a newly developed engine, the T5 series is essentially an FB/L50 2-cylinder with a third cylinder added, its origins thus dating back to 1961.

F engine 

1980–present – F engine (three-cylinder) – 0.5–0.8 L

G engine 

1984–2006 – G engine (three-cylinder) 1.0 L

K engine 

1994–present – K engine (three-cylinder) – 0.7–1.0 L

R engine 

2011–present – 0.7 L

Four cylinders

F engine 

1979–present – F engine (four-cylinder) – 0.7–1.1 L

G engine 

1984–present – G engine (four-cylinder) – 1.0–1.6 L

J engine 

1996–2019 – J engine (four-cylinder) – 1.8–2.4 L

K engine 

1997–present – K engine (four-cylinder) – 1.0–1.5 L

M engine 

1999–present – M engine– 1.3–1.8 L

E15A engine  
2019–2020 – see Diesel engines section – 1.5 L

V6 engines

H engine 

1994–2009 – H engine – 2.0–2.7 L

N engine 

2006–2009 – N engine – 3.2–3.6 L

Diesel engines

D engine 

2006–present – D engine – 1.3–2.0 L

Licensed from Fiat/FCA:
D13A 1.3 L (1,248 cc) 4-cylinder
Suzuki Wagon R+ (Europe)
 2007–2013 — Suzuki SX4 sedan 
 2009–2016 — Suzuki Splash/Maruti Suzuki Ritz
 2012–2019 — Suzuki Ertiga
 2014–2019 — Suzuki Ciaz
 2017–2019 — Suzuki Ignis
 2008–2020 — Suzuki Dzire
 2006–2020 — Suzuki Swift
 2013–2020 — Suzuki S-Cross
 2015–2020 — Suzuki Baleno
 2015–2020 — Suzuki Vitara Brezza
D16A 1.6 L (1,598 cc) 4-cylinder
 2015–present — Suzuki SX4 S-Cross
 2015–present — Suzuki Vitara
D19A 1.9 L (1,910 cc) 4-cylinder
 2006–2009 — Suzuki SX4 (Europe)
D20A 2.0 L (1,956 cc) 4-cylinder
 2010–2014 — Suzuki SX4 (Europe)

E engine  
 E08A — 0.8 L (793 cc) 2-cylinder
The E08A engine is a short-lived diesel engine engineered mostly for the Indian market. As a 360° parallel twin it features a Balance shaft located beside the crankshaft. This all aluminium engine is turbocharged and intercooled, has a 15:1 compression ratio and a DOHC cylinder head with 8 valves. Power output depends heavily on the application.
 E15A —  1.5 L (1,498 cc) 4-cylinder
 2019–2020 Suzuki Ciaz (India)
 2019–2020 Suzuki Ertiga (India)

See also 

 List of Suzuki automobiles

References
  
 

Suzuki